Felin Fran Halt railway station co-served the area of Llansamlet, in the historical county of Glamorganshire, Wales, from 1922 to 1956 on the Swansea District Line.

History 
The station was opened on 2 January 1922 by the Great Western Railway. It closed to passengers on 11 June 1956 and closed to goods in 1965.

References 

Disused railway stations in Swansea
Former Great Western Railway stations
Railway stations in Great Britain opened in 1922
Railway stations in Great Britain closed in 1956
1922 establishments in Wales
1956 disestablishments in Wales